The Nigerian lowland forests is a tropical moist forest ecoregion in southwestern Nigeria and southeastern Benin. The ecoregion is densely populated, and home to several large cities including Lagos, Ibadan, and Benin City.  There is still significant tree cover, but the remaining enclaves of forest are increasingly fragmented.  The ecoregion is wetter along the coast and drier inland, resulting in bands of vegetation zones that run parallel to the coast for the 400 km length of the region.

Geography
The Nigerian lowland forests are bounded on the south by coastal mangroves and the Gulf of Guinea, on the east by the Niger River and its delta, on the north by the Guinean forest-savanna mosaic. On the west it is bounded by the Dahomey Gap, a drier coastal region where forest-savanna mosaic extends all the way to the ocean, separating the Lower Guinean forests, of which the Nigerian lowland forests are part, from the Upper Guinean forests of West Africa.

Climate
The climate of the ecoregion is Tropical savanna climate - dry winter (Köppen climate classification (Aw)).  This climate is characterized by relatively even temperatures throughout the year, and a pronounced dry season.  The driest month has less than 60 mm of precipitation, and is drier than the average month.

Flora and fauna
About 48% of the territory is closed forest, mostly broadleaf evergreen trees.  Another 36% is open forest, 5% is urban and built up, and the remainder is wetland and herbaceous cover.  Because rainfall declines with distance from the sea, the ecoregion exhibits climate bands with vegetation zones that parallel the coast.  Closest to the sea is the rain forest zone, then the mixed deciduous forest zone and farthest inland the parkland zone.  In the rainforest zone the common trees are of the Leguminosae family (Brachystegia), Cylicodiscus gabunensis, Gossweilerodendron balsamiferum, Piptadeniastrum africanum, and by the Meliaceae family (Entandrophragma, Guarea, Khaya ivorensis, and Lovoa trichilioides.

While in general the levels of animal endemism is low in the ecoregion, there are some notable endemic species.  The endangered white-throated guenon (Cercopithecus erythrogaster) is only found in this ecoregion. The endangered Ibadan malimbe (Malimbus ibadanensis) is found in the northern parkland zone.  A recent survey of the Niger Delta recorded the endangered crested genet (Genetta cristata).  The Nigeria crag gecko (Cnemaspis petrodroma) and the Perret's toad (Bufo perreti) have also been recorded in the region.

Protected areas
Nominally, about 17% of the ecoregion is under some form of official protection, including:
 Akure Ofosu Forest Reserve
 Gilli-Gilli Game Reserve
 Ifon Game Reserve
 Kwale Game Reserve
 Okomu National Park
 Omo Forest Reserve
 Orle River Game Reserve
 Owo Forest Reserve

References

 
Afrotropical ecoregions
Ecoregions of Nigeria
Tropical and subtropical moist broadleaf forests